Camellia gilbertii is a species of plant in the family Theaceae. It is endemic to Vietnam.

References

gilbertii
Endemic flora of Vietnam
Trees of Vietnam
Vulnerable plants
Taxonomy articles created by Polbot
Taxa named by Auguste Chevalier